The white-winged cinclodes (Cinclodes atacamensis) is a species of bird in the family Furnariidae.
Its natural habitats are subtropical or tropical high-altitude grassland and rivers.

Subspecies
 Cinclodes atacamensis atacamensis: Puna grassland ;
 Cinclodes atacamensis schocolatinus: Sierras de Córdoba and northeastern San Luis.

References

white-winged cinclodes
Birds of the Puna grassland
Birds of Argentina
white-winged cinclodes
Taxonomy articles created by Polbot